The Stemme ASP S15 is a German two-seat powered sailplane designed and built by Stemme for use as an Airborne Systems Platform.

Design and development
The ASP S15 is a two-seat single-engined, all composite construction, powered sailplane with the engine mounted in the center fuselage. The cockpit has room for two in side-by-side configuration. It has a shoulder wing, a conventional T-tail and a retractable nose wheel landing gear. It can also be fitted with a 2-axis autopilot and external underwing payload pods.

The ASP S15-1 was granted a restricted type certificate by the European Aviation Safety Agency in October 2013.

Variant
ASP S15-1
Airborne Systems Platform which can be fitted with a 2-axis autopilot and external underwing payload pods.

Specifications

References

External links

ASP
Motor gliders
2000s German civil utility aircraft
Shoulder-wing aircraft
Mid-engined aircraft
Aircraft first flown in 2009
T-tail aircraft